= A Season of Sundays =

A Season of Sundays is a compilation of photographs taken by Sportsfile photographers, which has been published annually in Ireland since the mid-1990s. It is distributed nationally.

The food company Carroll's of Tullamore supports it.

A Season of Sundays has been described as "the key photographic collection of the latest GAA season" and "an annual sporting tradition".
